Call of the Jersey Devil is a 2013 horror novel by writer Aurelio Voltaire.

Plot

Six people become stranded in the Pine Barrens and battle the Jersey Devil.

References

2013 American novels
Novels set in New Jersey
Jersey Devil in fiction
Pine Barrens (New Jersey)